Abargil is a surname. Notable people with the surname include:

 Linor Abargil (born 1980), Israeli beauty pageant winner
 Yaniv Abargil (born 1977), Israeli footballer
 Abergil crime family

See also
 Abergel

Maghrebi Jewish surnames
Arabic-language surnames
Surnames of Moroccan origin